Kŭmsaeng station is a railway station in Kŭmsaeng-ri, greater Hoeryŏng city, North Hamgyŏng, North Korea, on the Hambuk Line of the Korean State Railway.

History
It was opened by the Tomun Railway Company on 5 January 1920, together with the rest of the Hoeryŏng-Sangsambong section of their line (Hoeryŏng-Tonggwanjin), which on 1 April 1929 was nationalised and became the West Tomun Line of the Chosen Government Railway.

References

Railway stations in North Korea